Mathura Junction railway station is an important station on Agra–Delhi chord of Delhi–Mumbai and Delhi–Chennai lines.  It is located in Mathura district in the Indian state of Uttar Pradesh. It is one of the important North-Central Railway station. It serves Mathura and Vrindavan.

Overview
Mathura is the birthplace of Lord Krishna. He spent his childhood in Vrindavan, 11 km away from Mathura. Therefore, both are major pilgrimage centres for Hindus. Mathura Refinery of Indian Oil Corporation which is one of the largest oil refineries of India is located at Mathura.

History
The -long Hath Road–Mathura Cantt line was opened in 1875 by Bombay, Baroda and Central India Railway. It was transferred to North Eastern Railway in 1952. The Mathura–Kasganj line was converted from -wide metre gauge to  broad gauge in 2009.

The -long metre-gauge Mathura– branch line was opened by Bombay, Baroda and Central Indian Railway in 1889.

Station
Mathura Junction has 10 platforms. There is a junction for southbound and westbound trains. It has connectivity with all major cities of India. There are seven routes / lines from this railway junction station. Platform 9 dedicate for  metre-gauge trains. As per the 2018 report released by Quality Council of India (QCI), station was declared the least clean station among the 75 major stations.

Electrification
The Faridabad–Mathura–Agra section was electrified in 1982–85. The Mathura–Bharatpur–Gangapur city line was electrified in 1985–86.

Amenities
Mathura Junction railway station has a tourist information centre, telephone booths, computerised reservation centre, waiting room, vegetarian and non-vegetarian refreshment rooms, and a book stall. Indian Railways, as part of its station redevelopment initiative, successfully renovated the Mathura's Railway station making it more convenient for passengers visiting the city by Railways. The station has new entry and exit gates, and the first class waiting room for the passengers has been revamped by providing new benches. Circulating area of the station has been modified.

Passengers
Mathura Junction is amongst the top hundred booking stations of Indian Railway. The junction is important as from here the routes of train coming from Delhi are bifurcated towards Mumbai and South Indian cities of Hyderabad, Bangalore and Chennai.

Gallery

See also
Mathura Cantt railway station
Agra Cantonment railway station
Hazrat Nizamuddin railway station
New Delhi railway station

References

External links
Trains passing through Mathura Junction Railway Station
 Trains at Mathura Junction

Railway junction stations in Uttar Pradesh
Railway stations in Mathura district
Agra railway division
Transport in Mathura
1904 establishments in India